Caelostomus picipes is a species of ground beetle in the subfamily Pterostichinae. It was described by W.S.Macleay in 1825. It occurs in Japan.

References

Caelostomus
Beetles of Asia
Insects of Japan
Endemic fauna of Japan
Beetles described in 1825
Taxa named by William Sharp Macleay